Menara Multi-Purpose is a skyscraper located along Jalan Munshi Abdullah in the midtown of Kuala Lumpur, Malaysia. The tower is headquarters to Multi-Purpose Holdings Berhad, MPI Generali Insurans Berhad, Alliance Bank, and Bandar Raya Developments Berhad.

History 
Menara Multi-Purpose was developed by Bandar Raya Developments Berhad (BRDB) and was completed in 1994. Menara Multi Purpose was designed by John Portman & Associates and Jurubena Bertiga International. It was initially envisaged to be part of a greater Capital Square commercial development. However, the 1997 Asian Financial Crisis stalled other components of the project, leaving the Menara Multi Purpose building the only completed structure then, surrounded by several partially completed and abandoned structures (including a second office tower). However, now Capital Square, or CapSquare as it has known, is a fully integrated neighbourhood with a second office tower, retail centre, a luxury residential tower and a second luxury residential tower recently launched.

Menara Multi-Purpose was headquarters to its developers, BRDB, who have now moved to a new headquarters, Menara BRDB, in their homeground of Bangsar.

In December 2016 the building was purchased by the Kumpulan Wang Persaraan (Diperbadankan) (KWAP), the second largest pension fund in Malaysia. With the sale price of RM474.3 million (US$107.25 million), this was the largest office building sale in the country in 2016.

Access

Bus 
The tower is located along Jalan Munshi Abdullah, which is home to a major bus hub. Examples of bus lines starting here are 300 (to Ampang Jaya), 200 (to Gombak) and 100 (to Kuala Selangor).

Rail 
Menara Multi Purpose is within walking distance to Bandaraya, Masjid Jamek and Dang Wangi metro stations, as well as Bank Negara Komuter station.

See also 
List of tallest buildings in Kuala Lumpur

References

External links 
 Multi Purpose Holdings website

Office buildings completed in 1994
1994 establishments in Malaysia
2016 mergers and acquisitions
John C. Portman Jr. buildings
Skyscraper office buildings in Kuala Lumpur